Shantilal Mukherjee is an Indian actor associated with Bengali-language theatre and films.

Biography 

Mukherjee was born in Kolkata. He lost his father in an early age. He was admitted in Sarsuna High School from where he passed Madhyamik examination. He passed Higher Secondary Examination from New Alipore Multipurpose High School. He graduated from the Asutosh College, a University of Calcutta affiliate.

Mukherjee is mainly knowns as a stage actor. Ramaprasad Banik and Chandan Sen taught him acting.
His son's name is Rwitobroto Mukherjee who is also an actor.

Filmography 

 Bandhan (2004) as Priyo Da, Rohit's friend
 Badsha the King (2004) as Kartik, Shaktinath's PA
 Antarmahal (2005) voice actor
 Shikar (2006)
 MLA Fatakeshto(2006) as Haridas, Ranodeb Pal's PA
 Anuranan (2006)
 Kaalbela (2009)
 Chaowa Pawa (2009)
 Kaler Rakhal (2009)
 Moner Manush (2010)
 Kahaani (2012)
 Macho Mustanaa (2012)
 Le Halwa Le (2012)
 Kidnapper (2013)
 Chhayamoy (2013)
 Kanamachi (2013)
 Kangal Malsat (2013)
 Baari Tar Bangla(2014)
 Chirodini Tumi Je Amar 2 (2014)
 The Royal Bengal Tiger (2014)
 Pendulum (2014)
Buno Haansh (2014) 
 Chotushkone (2014) 
Yoddha: The Warrior (2014) 
 Guddu Ki Gun (2015)
 Byomkesh Bakshi (2015)
Jamai 420 (2015) 
 Byomkesh O Chiriyakhana (2016)
Power (2016) 
 M.S. Dhoni: The Untold Story (2016) as Sarkar
 Amar Aponjon (2017)
 Chalbaaz (2018)
 Pari (2018) as Police Inspector
 Bhaijaan Elo Re (2018)
 Goyenda Tatar (2018)
Kaali (2018)
 Jamai Badal (2019)
 Bhootchakra Pvt. Ltd. (2019)
 India’s Most Wanted (2019)
 Goyenda Junior (2019)
 Panther (2019)
 Mukhosh (2020)
 Rawkto Rawhoshyo (2020)
 SOS Kolkata (2020) 
 Michhil (2020)
  Tiki-Taka  (2020)
 Miss Call (2021)
 F.I.R No. 339/07/06 (film)
 Ogo Bidesini (2022)

Radio
 In 2022, Radio Mirchi Kolkata aired Sunil Gangopadhyay's Kakababu adventure story Bhoyonkor Sundor. The character of Kakababu was voiced by Mukherjee while  RJ Agni voiced the charecter of Santu.

Awards
 2021: Films and Frames Digital Film Awards - Best Performance in A Negative Role for FIR (2021 film)

See also 
 Kaushik Sen

References

External links 
 

Bengali male actors
Living people
Bengali theatre personalities
Asutosh College alumni
University of Calcutta alumni
Male actors in Bengali cinema
Year of birth missing (living people)
Bengali male television actors
Actors from Kolkata